Abasgia may refer to:

Region inhabited by ancient Abasgoi tribes
Kingdom of Abkhazia, 778–1008
Kingdom of Georgia, 1008 to 1490/91, also referred to as Abasgia

Former countries in Europe